Petr Hejma (born 27 June 1944 in Prague) is an ice hockey player who played for the Czechoslovak national team. He won a silver medal at the 1968 Winter Olympics.

References

External links

1944 births
Ice hockey players at the 1968 Winter Olympics
Living people
Olympic ice hockey players of Czechoslovakia
Olympic medalists in ice hockey
Olympic silver medalists for Czechoslovakia
Medalists at the 1968 Winter Olympics
Ice hockey people from Prague
Czechoslovak defectors
Naturalized citizens of Germany
West German ice hockey forwards
Czech ice hockey forwards
Czechoslovak ice hockey forwards
West German ice hockey coaches
Czechoslovak emigrants to West Germany
Czechoslovak ice hockey coaches
Czech ice hockey coaches